Lake Herrera is a small lake located at  from the urban centre of Mosquera and about  west of the capital Bogotá in Cundinamarca, Colombia. The Andean lake has made its name in the Herrera Period, the period in the history of central Colombia before the Muisca Period, after archaeologist Sylvia Broadbent excavated ceramics around Lake Herrera in 1971.

Description 

Lake Herrera is situated on the Bogotá savanna; the southwestern part of the Andean high plateau in the Eastern Ranges; the Altiplano Cundiboyacense. The lake is one of many remainders of the Pleistocene Lake Humboldt. It is the largest remaining natural water reserve on the Bogotá savanna and the reserve belongs to the municipalities Mosquera, Madrid and Bojacá.

History 

Investigations by archaeologist Gonzalo Correal Urrego in 1984 have revealed the existence of a preceramic site with two layers. The oldest layer has been dated at 3410 years BP and the younger layer at 3135 BP.

Correal Urrego has discovered preceramic tools and wooden beams in horizontal position, possibly used to against the lake overflowing. Different stone tools found are scrapers and chips with sharp edges. Other tools were handles, and white-tailed deer bone tools for perforation, scraping and cutting. Evidence of fireplaces and burial grounds has been uncovered. One of the burial sites contained a full skeleton surrounded by five skulls. Remains of fauna collected by the hunter-gatherers were mammals, birds and snails. The presence of basalt, not formed on the Altiplano, indicated movement from the Magdalena Valley.

When the climatic conditions became drier and layers of volcanic ash were deposited around the lake in the first millennium BCE, the inhabitants of the region started to develop agriculture around the lake.

Later excavations have provided ceramic with a typical red colour, rich in SiO2.

The lake is a residual part of Lake Humboldt, but since 1973 functions as an artificial lake after the construction of drainage channels. The lake is fed from the Bojacá River from the northeast and from the San José channel, fed by the Bogotá River in the southwest.

Recent mining activities close to the lake endanger the environment of Lake Herrera, formalised a water reserve on July 23, 2006.

Biodiversity 
Flora and fauna around the lake is endangered and migrating birds use Lake Herrera. Several species have been found and described in and around the lake:
 thickhead ground snake (Atractus crassicaudatus)
 Cheilanthes myriophylla
 Drymaeus nigrofasciatus
 Stenocercus trachycephalus

Tourism 
The lake can be visited and walked around, although some parts are privately owned and access permits have to be arranged.

Trivia 
 Another name for Lake Herrera and its surroundings is Sabrisky Desert

See also 

 Bogotá savanna, wetlands of Bogotá
 Herrera Period, El Infiernito

References

Bibliography

Further reading

External links 
  Video Lake Herrera

Geography of Cundinamarca Department
Herrera
Former populated places in Colombia
Herrera
Tourist attractions near Bogotá
Herrera
Herrera
Altiplano Cundiboyacense
Archaeological sites in Colombia